The 2000–01 Washington Capitals season was the Washington Capitals 27th season in the National Hockey League (NHL).

Offseason

Regular season

Final standings

Schedule and results

Playoffs

Player statistics

Regular season
Scoring

Goaltending

Playoffs
Scoring

Goaltending

Awards and records

Transactions

Draft picks
Washington's draft picks at the 2000 NHL Entry Draft held at the Pengrowth Saddledome in Calgary, Alberta.

See also
 2000–01 NHL season

References
 

Wash
Wash
Washington Capitals seasons
Washington Capitals
Washington Capitals